Alex Wilson (born 21 November 1971) is a pianist, composer, producer, arranger, and educator.

Biography
Alex was born in the UK and was brought up in Sierra Leone, UK, Austria and Switzerland.

In 1993, after gaining a degree in electronics from the University of York, he embarked on a professional career as a pianist, performing and recording with Courtney Pine, Jazz Jamaica, Sandra Cross, Adalberto Santiago and Jocelyn Brown, Wynton Marsalis, Hugh Masakela & Ernest Ranglin quickly being signed to the Candid label. He won the Rising Star award at the 2001 BBC Jazz Awards.

To date, he has released eight solo albums in a Latin Jazz and salsa vein; he also composes commissions, produces Latin hip hop, runs a 12-piece salsa band, works as a session keyboard player and works in educational institutions. His commissions include NITRO (a British black theatre company), the Royal Opera House, the Royal Northern College of Music, and several library music companies. He also works with in schools in London such as Essex Primary School.

Alex Wilson is Special Lecturer in the Department of Music at University of Nottingham.

In 2011, Alex was invited to be pianist, arranger and musical director for guitar duo Rodrigo y Gabriela on their album Area 52 which was recorded in Havana, Cuba, with C.U.B.A., a 13-piece Cuban orchestra, and special guest musicians (Anoushka Shankar on sitar and Le Trio Joubran on oud). The album was released in January 2012.  The project toured the world in 2012, during which Alex continued his role as pianist and musical director.

2013 saw the release of his first album for trio with Davide Mantovani on bass, and Frank Tontoh and Tristan Banks on drums. The album is called 'Trio' and is released on Alex Wilson Records.

Discography
Anglo Cubano (Candid Records, 1999)
Afro-Saxon (Candid Records, 2001)
R&B Latino (Candid Records, 2002)
Aventuras (Alex Wilson Records, 2005)
Inglaterra (Alex Wilson Records, 2007)
Salsa con Soul (Alex Wilson Records, 2008)
Mali Latino (Alex Wilson Records, 2010)
Alex Wilson presents Salsa Veritas (Salsa Veritas GmbH 2011)
Alex Wilson - Trio (Alex Wilson Records, 2013)
Selected Discography as sidesman
2012    Diaspora                                Wilber Calver - pianist/arranger/producer
2012    Area 52                                 Rodrigo y Gabriela - pianist/arranger
2008 	Transition in Tradition		        Courtney Pine	
2008	Afropeans 				Courtney Pine	featured guest	
2007	Boulevard de l’Independence	        Toumani Diabate
2007	I Love Louis				Gwyn Jay Allen	musical director, arranger, producer
2005	Motor City Roots			Jazz Jamaica	pianist / arranger
2005	Tears of Joy				Antonio Forcione	
2004	Massive					Jazz Jamaica	pianist / arranger
2001	Victory’s Happy Songbook		Cleveland Watkiss
1999	Just a Dream				Sandra Cross
1998	Dreams Come True			Sandra Cross
1997	Migrations				Gary Crosby’s Nu Troop

References

External links

Website

British jazz pianists
1971 births
Living people
Alumni of the University of York
21st-century pianists